Heitor Villa-Lobos's Étude No. 1, part of his 12 Studies for Guitar, was first published by Max Eschig, Paris, in 1953.

History
The first public performance of this étude (together with those of Études 7 and 8) was given by Andrés Segovia on 5 March 1947 at Wellesley College in Wellesley, Massachusetts.

Structure

The piece is in E minor and is marked Allegro non troppo. A strong presence of J. S. Bach's Well-Tempered Clavier suggests a miniature Bachianas Brasileiras.

Analysis

Étude No. 1 is an arpeggio study that is predominantly focused on a cross-string right-hand technique with the exception of one scalar passage from bar (music)measure 23 to 24 and a series of cadential harmonics in measures 31 to 32.

References

Sources

Further reading
 Wright, Simon. 1992. Villa-Lobos. Oxford Studies of Composers. Oxford and New York: Oxford University Press.  (cloth);  (pbk).

External links

Compositions by Heitor Villa-Lobos
1947 compositions
Guitar études
Compositions in E minor